George Humphrey (1739–1826) was an English auctioneer and dealer.

Humphrey purchased and sold "curiosities", notably shells, insect and bird specimens and ethnographic specimens. Much of his stock was purchased from ships' crews, in particular from Captain Cook's voyages. His 1810 address was 48 Long Acre, 4 Leicester Street, Leicester Square, London. His sister Elizabeth (1735–1816) married a leading international mineral dealer Adolarius Jacob Forster and she ran Forster's London shop.
 
George Humphrey wrote and published:

Humphrey, G., 1782. Catalogue of Manufactures, Mechanical Performances and other Inventions of the Natives of the new-discovered, or but seldom visited Countries in the pacific Ocean.
Humphrey, G., 1799 Museum Humfredianum.

References
Michael P. Cooper, "Keeping it in the Family: the Humphreys, Forsters and Heulands", Matrix : a journal of the history of minerals,. vol.9, no.1 (2001), p. 3-31 
John Wilfred Jackson, A letter from George Humphrey to William Swainson, 1815, Journal of Conchology, 20 (1937), pp. 332–7; British Library, Add MS 42071, ff. 123-145
Adrienne L.Kaeppler, 'Holophusicon, the Leverian Museum', 2011, p. 107 
F.D. Steinheimer The whereabouts of pre-nineteenth century bird specimens Zool. Med. Leiden 79-3 (5), 30-ix-2005, 45–67.— ISSN 0024-0672.pdf

English naturalists
English natural history collectors
English merchants
1826 deaths
1739 births